Dischinger is a surname and may refer to:

 Franz Dischinger (1887-1953), pioneering German civil and structural engineer
 Rudolf Dischinger (1904–1988), German painter
 Terence "Terry" Gilbert Dischinger (born 1940), American basketball player
 Hermann Dischinger (born 1944), German dialect author and poet

References

German-language surnames